Tongbao can refer to: 

 wikt: 同胞, a Chinese term for comrade, see tongzhi (term)
 T'oung Pao a Dutch journal and the oldest international journal of sinology founded in 1890
 A type of Imperial Chinese coinage
 Kaiyuan Tongbao
 Yongle Tongbao
 Hongwu Tongbao
 Kangxi Tongbao
 Qianlong Tongbao